Siege of Mantua can refer to:
 Siege of Mantua (1630) (War of the Mantuan Succession, French defending)
 Siege of Mantua (1702) (War of the Spanish Succession, French defending)
Siege of Mantua (1796–97) (First Coalition, French besieging)
Siege of Mantua (1799) (Second Coalition, French defending)